South Carolina Highway 121 (SC 121) is a  major state highway that travels north and south in central parts of the U.S. state of South Carolina. The highway is actually part of a long multi-state highway that also exists in Florida and Georgia, as Florida State Road 121 and Georgia State Route 121, respectively. Some see it as a de facto auxiliary route from U.S. Route 21 (US 21) in Rock Hill. Efforts to have the road upgraded to such status have failed however.

Route description

SC 121 continues its concurrency with U.S. Route 25 (US 25) from Augusta, Georgia into North Augusta, South Carolina. In the Schultz Hill section of North Augusta, US 25/SC 121 leaves the concurrency with US 1 and US 78, and heads north. Still within North Augusta, it has an interchange with Interstate 520 (I-520) at exit 22 and I-20 (at exit 5).

In Trenton at the northern terminus of SC 19, US 25 turns to the north. From there the route becomes independent and it runs mainly through rural western South Carolina. Johnston is where the route serves as the northern terminus of SC 191 and later crosses SC 23.

In Saluda, SC 121 is overlapped by US 178/SC 39, then intersects US 378. The overlap with US 178/SC 39 ends at Travis Road. Later it crosses a bridge over the Saluda River and is then overlapped with SC 34 until it reaches Newberry. Barely inside Newberry, the route becomes the terminus of SC 395 and then has a major intersection with US 76. Further north it encounters a quarter-cloverleaf interchanges with I-26 (at exit 72).

North of Newberry, it encounters yet another concurrency with US 176, which it follows straight north before curving to the west as it enters Whitmire, where the routes make a sharp turn to the east and encounters the beginning of a long concurrency with SC 72. After a bridge over the Enoree River, the concurrency with US 176 ends just east of Whitmire.

SC 121/72 runs through Carlisle where it has another concurrency with SC 215, which ends east of the bridge over the Broad River, which contains a monument to an American Revolutionary battle known as the Battle of Fishdam Ford.

SC 121/72 does not encounter any major junctions for about 12 miles (19.3 km) until they reach Chester, where SC 121/72 has another concurrency, this time with US 321/SC 9. This concurrency runs southeast until US 321 branches off to the south at the southern terminus of US 321 Business (US 321 Bus.). The routes continue to the east along SC 97, running beneath a railroad bridge, and then turning toward the north. SC 9 makes a right turn at Lancaster Avenue, which is the eastern terminus of SC 9 Bus. SC 121/72/97 has an at-grade crossing with another railroad line leading to the city, and then SC 121/72 branches off to the right at Saluda Road (SC 72 Bus.), while SC 97 continues north.

The concurrency with SC 72 finally ends at SC 901 in Rock Hill. Within the city, it joins briefly with SC 5, before merging with its final concurrency, US 21.  Traversing east of the downtown area, its journey ends at Cherry Road, where US 21 continues north towards Fort Mill, while also connecting with SC 322.

SC 121 is one of the most concurrent state highways in South Carolina. It shares long stretches of pavement with these two routes:

 US 25 from the Georgia state line to Trenton (20 miles)

 SC 72 from Whitmire to Rock Hill (46 miles, as well as the longest concurrency in South Carolina)
It has shorter concurrencies with US 1, 78, and 278 (altogether), SC 230, US 178, SC 39, SC 34, US 176, SC 215, US 321, SC 9, SC 97, SC 909, SC 5, and US 21.

History
SC 121 had two previous stints in the state before its current routing was established.  The first SC 121 was established in 1925 or 1926 as a new primary routing; it traversed from SC 27 in Aiken, northeast through Wagener and Pelion, to SC 2/SC 12 in Springdale.  In 1928, it was renumbered as SC 215.

The second SC 121 was established in 1929 or 1930 as new primary routing; it traversed from US 21 in Branchville, east through Bowman, to SC 31 in Providence.  In 1937 or 1938, SC 121 was extended along US 78 before branching off to end at SC 65; its eastern terminus was also extended to US 15.  In 1940, SC 121 was extended southwest to SC 362, and east to SC 6 in Vance.  In 1948, SC 121 was truncated on both ends, from US 21 to US 15; its routing to SC 61 became Farrell's Road (S-5-18).  By 1952, it was extended east to SC 310 in Vance.  In 1953, it was extended completely back to SC 6.  In 1962-1964, the entire route was renumbered as SC 210.

The third, and current, SC 121 was established in 1962-1964, which formed a three-state route (continues south as Georgia State Route 121 and Florida State Road 121 to Lebanon Station, Florida).  From North Augusta to Rock Hill, it was placed on concurrencies with various highways throughout the state; with exception around Whitmire, where it replaced part of SC 19.  Its routing has remained unchanged since inception.

Major intersections

Special routes

Chester business loop

SC 121 Business (SC 121 Bus.) was established in 1964 to run concurrently with SC 72 Bus.; through downtown Chester, via West End Street, Main Street and Saluda Street/Road.  It was never part of mainline SC 121, as it bypassed Chester to the south and east with SC 72.  It is unknown when the business loop was decommissioned.

See also

References

External links

 
 Mapmikey's South Carolina Highways Page: SC 121
 Mapmikey's South Carolina Highways Page: Former SC 121 Business

121
Transportation in York County, South Carolina
Transportation in Chester County, South Carolina
Transportation in Union County, South Carolina
Transportation in Newberry County, South Carolina
Transportation in Saluda County, South Carolina
Transportation in Edgefield County, South Carolina
Transportation in Aiken County, South Carolina